In Argentina, the most important law enforcement organization is the Argentine Federal Police with jurisdiction in all Argentine territory. Most routine police work is carried out by provincial/state police forces. In recent years, several cities (such as Saldan and Villa Allende) started their own local police forces to reduce the burden on the State Police. The capital city of Buenos Aires (a federal district), where the Argentine Federal Police works with Argentine Naval Prefecture (Coast Guard) and Buenos Aires City Police (Municipal police).

Federal agencies 

Argentine Federal Police
Argentine National Gendarmerie
Argentine Naval Prefecture
Airport Security Police
Federal Penitentiary Service

Provincial Police Forces 

 Buenos Aires Provincial Police
 Catamarca Provincial Police
 Chaco Provincial Police
 Chubut Provincial Police
 Córdoba Provincial Police
 Corrientes Provincial Police
 Entre Ríos Provincial Police
 Formosa Provincial Police
 Jujuy Provincial Police
 La Pampa Provincial Police
 La Rioja Provincial Police
 Mendoza Provincial Police
 Misiones Provincial Police
 Neuquén Provincial Police
 Río Negro Provincial Police
 Salta Provincial Police
 San Juan Provincial Police
 San Luis Provincial Police
 Santa Cruz Provincial Police
 Santa Fe Provincial Police
 Santiago del Estero Provincial Police
 Tierra del Fuego Provincial Police
 Tucumán Provincial Police

Local Forces 

Buenos Aires City Police
Lomas de Zamora City Police
Villa Allende City Police
Saldan City Police
Córdoba Municipal Police

Tactical Forces 

Hawk Special Operations Brigade
Special Operations Troops Company
Infantry Guard Corps
Escorpion Group
Albatross Group
Federal Special Operations Group
Special Group One

Intelligence agencies 

Intelligence Secretariat
Argentine Federal Police Intelligence
Argentine National Gendarmerie Intelligence
Argentine Naval Prefecture Intelligence
Airport Security Police Intelligence
Federal Penitentiary Service Intelligence
Inteligencia de la Policía Bonaerense

Historical secret police organizations
Sociedad Popular Restauradora ("Mazorca")
Sección Especial de Represión al Comunismo (SERC) (Special Section for the Repression of Communism)
División de Información Política Antidemocrática (DIPA) (Political Anti-democratic Information Division)

Corruption

Corruption is a pervasive and widespread practice among police agents in Argentina. It’s hard to know with precision the extent of corruption within Argentine law enforcement. Corruption is difficult to measure because most of it is never discovered and/or is not reported. However, there are some numbers that can indicate the extent of the problem in Argentina. In 2008, there were 120 investigations against police officers in relation to allegations of corruption and criminal involvement.

In the Buenos Aires Provincial Police force alone, there were 13,619 police officers investigated for acts of corruption, violence, and/or irregularities between 2008 and 2009 according to the General Auditing Office of Internal Affairs. Global Integrity ranks Argentine law enforcement as weak on anti-corruption performance with a score of 63 over 100. Likewise, Transparency International (TI)’s Bribe Payers Index 2008 gives the Argentine police a score of 3.9 on a 5-point scale, 1 being 'not at all corrupt' and 5 'extremely corrupt.'

The most common form of corruption practiced in Argentina by police agents is the request of a bribe or the acceptance of a bribe offered by citizens who committed a traffic violation or any ordinary infringement of the law in order to avoid legal penalties. According to Barómetro de las Américas done by the Latin American Public Opinion Project, in Argentina, 15% of the population has been asked for a bribe by a police agent. This finding is backed by the Latinobarómetro 2008, which found that 59% of Argentines believe that it is possible to bribe a policeman in order to avoid a fine or arrest.

There is also strong evidence that police agents act in connivance with criminals. In exchange for a percentage of the proceeds from criminal activities, police officers facilitate “freed zones” –where police officers do not go in- for thieves to be able to carry out robberies or kidnappings, or for drug dealers to be able to sell drugs. In other words, it is a common practice for criminals in Argentina to operate under protection of the police. In addition, law enforcement officers are known to be involved in organized criminal activities. According to Freedom House 2010, Buenos Aires police has been involved in several incidents of drug trafficking and extortion. Police officers are also involved in arms trafficking. Police arms depots or warehouses function as a source of weapons for the black market.

Dynamics 
Police corruption in Argentina is due to several factors. In the first place, poor salaries are an incentive towards petty corruption within the police. Similarly, budget constraints affect the police's ability to carry out their mandate, decreasing morale and commitment towards their mission within the law enforcement institution. These factors reinforce an already existing and widespread tolerance for corruption, which fuels this illegal practice. Moreover, a high rate of impunity for police corruption fails to act as a deterrent against this practice. Criminal proceedings against police officers are generally avoided because of a lack of resources or the lack of will to investigate police corruption cases. Lastly, the Argentine law enforcement lacks mechanisms for transparency and accountability, rendering the police force a very hard institution to control.

The most deleterious effect of police corruption is the inefficacy of law enforcement to fight crime. According to an investigation by La Nación, the police force in Argentina has only been able to capture 32% of the alleged perpetrators of the most heinous crimes committed between July and August 2010. This incompetence has a direct correlation to the growing levels of crime found in Argentina. At the same time, it causes police forces to be less trusted by its citizens. In fact, the World Economic Forum’s Global Competitiveness Report 2010-2011 indicates that the reliability of the Argentine police services to enforce law and order achieves a score of 3.0 on a 7-point scale, 1 being 'cannot be relied upon at all' and 7 'can always be relied upon.'

Another serious consequence brought about by police corruption is its contribution to the deep weakening of the rule of law in Argentina. If the police force fails to carry out its mission and loses the citizens’ trust and respect, its power of deterrence against illegal acts is lost, promoting the violation of laws by its own citizens, in addition to encouraging crime. In the end, this also drives citizens to stop reporting crimes because of their lack of trust and respect for law enforcement. For all these reasons, Argentines consider the police force to be one of the most corrupt institutions in the country. Most citizens in the country defend themselves from criminals acts with weapons like pistols rather than informing the police about the criminal acts in the country.

With the recent creation of the Buenos Aires Metropolitan Police in 2009, an increasing number of city residences have opted to report crimes to the Metropolitan Police instead of the Federal Police due to its corruption problems.

See also 
 2013 police revolts in Argentina
 Crime in Argentina

References